Postal codes in Slovenia are numerical strings which form part of a postal address in Slovenia. The codes consist of four digits written without separator characters, the first digit represents the region and the last three digits represent the individual post office.

See Also

Slovenia
Postal system of Slovenia